Black City may refer to:

 Black City (Division of Laura Lee album), 2002
 Black City (Matthew Dear album), 2010
 Black City, a song by Mustasch, from the album Ratsafari, 2003
 Black City (band), Danish rockband
 Chicago, Illinois, as referred to before the 1893 World's Fair, e.g., in The Devil in the White City
 Black City (Baku), a mainly industrial neighbourhood of Baku, Azerbaijan
 Black City (film), a 1961 Italian comedy-drama film
 Khara-Khoto, a former city in Inner Mongolia that was visited by Marco Polo